Nathan Lamar Miller Jr. (August 12, 1987 – June 4, 2022) was an American professional basketball player. He played college basketball for the UNC Wilmington Seahawks and Bowling Green Falcons. Miller played professionally in Spain, Israel, Mexico and Argentina before he finished his career in South Korea following the 2018–19 season.

Miller returned to his hometown of Springfield, Ohio, after his playing career and ran an organization called MillerzElite Basketball that hosted basketball camps for children. He died on June 4, 2022, due to "acute exacerbation of asthma" at the age of 34.

References

External links
College statistics
ESPN Profile
Eurobasket.com Profile
Bowling Green Falcons bio

Videos
Nate Miller Highlight - Youtube.com video

1987 births
2022 deaths
American expatriate basketball people in Argentina
American expatriate basketball people in Israel
American expatriate basketball people in Mexico
American expatriate basketball people in South Korea
American expatriate basketball people in Spain
American men's basketball players
Basketball players from Ohio
Bowling Green Falcons men's basketball players
Sportspeople from Springfield, Ohio
Point guards
Shooting guards
Ulsan Hyundai Mobis Phoebus players
UNC Wilmington Seahawks men's basketball players